Wyżnik is a river of Poland, a right tributary of the Klikawa, which it meets in the village of Lewin Kłodzki.

Rivers of Poland
Rivers of Lower Silesian Voivodeship